Remy Jose Banks (born 1988) is an American rapper.  He is best known as a member of the New York music collective World's Fair, currently signed to Fool's Gold Records. Banks is also member of the music group Children of the Night, with fellow World's Fair members Nasty Nigel and Lansky Jones.

Career

2010–2012: World Famous and Queens... Revisited 
On December 24, 2010, Remy Banks released the collaborative mixtape, World Famous, with record producer Hannibal King. On March 27, 2012, Remy Banks, Nasty Nigel, and Lansky Jones, as Children of the Night, released the studio album Queens... Revisited, under Mishka NYC.

2013–present: Bastards of the Party and higher. 
On September 3, 2013, Remy Banks' Grammy-winning hip hop collective, World's Fair, released their debut studio album, Bastards of the Party, under Fool's Gold Records. On May 17, 2015, Remy Banks released his debut solo mixtape, higher..

Two of Banks' singles have charted on Billboard Twitter Real-Time: rem at #31 on March 7, 2015, and N1go at #50 on March 26, 2016.

Discography

Extended plays

Mixtapes

Collaborative studio albums

Guest appearances

References 

Living people
21st-century American rappers
1988 births